The Traitor Within is a 1923 film promoting the Ku Klux Klan. The Toll of Justice was another Klan film made the same year.

The films succeeded the popular and influential 1915 D. W. Griffith film The Birth of a Nation. British professor and author Tom Rice wrote about the film in his book White Robes, Silver Screens: Movies and the Making of the Ku Klux Klan.

References

1923 films
American propaganda films